The 1925 Stanley Cup Finals saw the Western Canada Hockey League (WCHL) champion Victoria Cougars defeat the National Hockey League (NHL) champion Montreal Canadiens three games to one in a best-of-five game series. The Canadiens were substitute NHL representatives, as the final series to decide the NHL champion was not played.

The Cougars were the last non-NHL team to win the Cup as the WCHL (renamed the Western Hockey League for the 1925–26 season) folded after 1926, leaving the Stanley Cup to become the NHL's de facto championship trophy.  The Cougars would also be the last team based west of Chicago to win the Cup until the Edmonton Oilers won the trophy in 1984. These were also the last Stanley Cup Finals games to be played in Western Canada until the Vancouver Canucks qualified for the 1982 Finals. Games one, three and four were held in Victoria. Game two, held in Vancouver, was the last neutral site game in Stanley Cup Finals history that did not involve the New York Rangers until the 2020 Stanley Cup Finals.

Path to the Finals
Prior to the season, the Pacific Coast Hockey Association (PCHA) folded and two of its teams, the Cougars and the Vancouver Maroons joined the WCHL. Victoria finished the 1924–25 WCHL regular season in third place, but eventually upset the Calgary Tigers in the two-game total goals WCHL championship series by a combined score of 3–1.

Meanwhile, the Canadiens also finished the NHL regular season in third place. In the NHL playoffs, Montreal went on to beat the second place Toronto St. Patricks, 5–2, in a two-game total goals series. The winner of that series was to go on and play the first place Hamilton Tigers. However, the Tigers were suspended after Hamilton players staged a strike in an attempt to receive more compensation because the league extended the regular season from 24 to 30 games. As a result, the Canadiens were declared the 1924–25 NHL champions.

Game summaries
With the demise of the PCHA, the Stanley Cup playoffs reverted to a single best-of-five series to determine the champion. However, the Cup Finals still annually rotated between the east and the west, and thus all of the games in the 1925 Finals were played on the West Coast. Games one, three and four were played at the 4,200 seat Patrick Arena in Victoria; Game two was played at the Denman Arena in Vancouver. The decision to use the larger Denman Arena (10,500 seats) for game two was based on the huge demand for tickets. The Cougars jumped to a two games to none series lead with 5–2 and 3–1 victories, but the Canadiens won game three, 4–2. In game four, Gizzy Hart scored the game-winning goal in Victoria's 6–1 win to clinch the Cup.

Cougars goaltender Hap Holmes recorded a 2.00 goal-against average for the series. Jack Walker led Victoria in goals with four, while Frank Fredrickson scored three. Overall, eight different player combining for the Cougars' 16 goals.

Stanley Cup engraving
The 1925 Stanley Cup was presented to Cougars captain Clem Loughlin by the trophy's trustee William Foran, following the Cougars 6–1 win over the Canadiens in game four.

The following Cougars players and staff had their names engraved on the Stanley Cup

1924–25 Victoria Cougars

See also
1924–25 NHL season
1924–25 WCHL season

References

 

Notes

Stanley Cup
Stanley Cup Finals
Montreal Canadiens games
Western Canada Hockey League postseason
Stanley
March 1925 sports events
Sports competitions in Victoria, British Columbia
20th century in Victoria, British Columbia
Ice hockey competitions in Vancouver
1920s in Vancouver
1925 in British Columbia